Lycée Faidherbe is a senior high school/sixth-form college in Lille, France.

It includes a boarding facility for Classe préparatoire aux grandes écoles (CPGE) students.

Notable alumni
Bernard Arnault, billionaire businessman
Jean-Pierre Demailly, mathematician

References

External links
 Lycée Faidherbe 

Lycées in Lille
Boarding schools in France